Casearia mannii is a species of flowering plant in the family Salicaceae. It is endemic to São Tomé and Príncipe, where it is restricted to the island of Príncipe. It is listed as vulnerable by the IUCN.

References

Flora of Príncipe
mannii
Vulnerable plants
Taxonomy articles created by Polbot